Lyubomyrivka may refer to the following places in Ukraine:

Lyubomyrivka, Dnipropetrovsk Oblast
Lyubomyrivka, Khmelnytskyi Oblast
Lyubomyrivka, Kyiv Oblast
Lyubomyrivka, Bereznehuvate settlement hromada, Bashtanka Raion, Mykolaiv Oblast
Lyubomyrivka, Kazanka settlement hromada, Bashtanka Raion, Mykolaiv Oblast
Lyubomyrivka, Mykolaiv Raion, Mykolaiv Oblast
Lyubomyrivka, Zaporizhzhia Oblast